Constantin Alin Nistor (born 9 November 1991, București) is a Romanian professional football player.

External links
 
 
 

1991 births
Liga I players
Liga II players
Living people
Romanian footballers
Association football forwards
FC Sportul Studențesc București players
AS Voința Snagov players
FC Dinamo București players